Stephen Colin Yates (born 30 August 1951) is a former English cricketer.  Yates was a right-handed batsman.  He was born in Manchester, Lancashire.

Yates made his debut for Cheshire in the 1983 Minor Counties Championship against Shropshire.  Yates played Minor counties cricket for Cheshire from 1983 to 1986, including 30 Minor Counties Championship matches and 10 MCCA Knockout Trophy matches.  In 1985, he made his List A debut against Yorkshire in the NatWest Trophy.  He a further List A match for Cheshire, against Surrey in 1986.  In his two List A matches, he scored 26 runs at a batting average of 13.00, with a high score of 20.

References

External links
Stephen Yates at ESPNcricinfo
Stephen Yates at CricketArchive

1951 births
Living people
Cricketers from Manchester
English cricketers
Cheshire cricketers